Jean-Pierre Le Roux may refer to:

 Jean-Pierre Le Roux (chess player) (born 1982), French chess player
 Jean-Pierre le Roux (cricketer) (born 1993), South African cricketer